The Fairchild Republic A-10 Thunderbolt II is a single-seat, twin-turbofan, straight-wing, subsonic attack aircraft developed by Fairchild Republic for the United States Air Force (USAF). In service since 1976, it is named for the Republic P-47 Thunderbolt, a World War II-era fighter-bomber effective at attacking ground targets, but is commonly referred to as the "Warthog" or simply "Hog". The A-10 was designed to provide close air support (CAS) to friendly ground troops by attacking armored vehicles, tanks, and other enemy ground forces; it is the only production-built aircraft designed solely for CAS to have served with the U.S. Air Force. Its secondary mission is to direct other aircraft in attacks on ground targets, a role called forward air controller-airborne; aircraft used primarily in this role are designated OA-10.

The A-10 was intended to improve on the performance and firepower of the Douglas A-1 Skyraider. Its ability to take off and land from relatively short runways permits operation from airstrips close to the front lines, and its simple design enables maintenance with minimal facilities.

The A-10 served in the Gulf War (Operation Desert Storm), the American–led intervention against Iraq's invasion of Kuwait, where the aircraft distinguished itself. The A-10 also participated in other conflicts such as in Grenada, the Balkans, Afghanistan, the Iraq War, and against the Islamic State in the Middle East.

The A-10A single-seat variant was the only version produced, though one pre-production airframe was modified into the YA-10B twin-seat prototype to test an all-weather night-capable version. In 2005, a program was started to upgrade the remaining A-10A aircraft to the A-10C configuration, with modern avionics for use with precision weaponry. The U.S. Air Force had stated the Lockheed Martin F-35 Lightning II would replace the A-10 as it entered service, but this remains highly contentious within the USAF and in political circles.  With a variety of upgrades and wing replacements, the A-10's service life can be extended to 2040; the service has no planned retirement date .

Development

Background

The development of conventionally armed attack aircraft in the United States stagnated after World War II, as design efforts for tactical aircraft focused on the delivery of nuclear weapons using high-speed designs like the McDonnell F-101 Voodoo and Republic F-105 Thunderchief. As the U.S. military entered the Vietnam War, its main ground-attack aircraft was the Korean War-era Douglas A-1 Skyraider. A capable aircraft for its era, with a relatively large payload and long loiter time, the propeller-driven design was relatively slow and vulnerable to ground fire.  The U.S. Air Force and Navy lost 266 A-1s in action in Vietnam, largely from small-arms fire. The A-1 Skyraider also had inadequate firepower.

The lack of modern conventional attack capability prompted calls for a specialized attack aircraft. On 7 June 1961, the Secretary of Defense Robert McNamara ordered the USAF to develop two tactical aircraft, one for the long-range strike and interdictor role, and the other focusing on the fighter-bomber mission. The former was the Tactical Fighter Experimental (TFX) intended to be common design for the USAF and the US Navy, which emerged as the General Dynamics F-111 Aardvark, while the second was filled by a version of the U.S. Navy's McDonnell Douglas F-4 Phantom II. While the Phantom went on to be one of the most successful fighter designs of the 1960s and proved to be a capable fighter-bomber, its lack of loiter time was a major problem, and to a lesser extent, its poor low-speed performance. It was also expensive to buy and operate, with a flyaway cost of $2 million in FY1965 ($ million today), and operational costs over $900 per hour ($ per hour today).

After a broad review of its tactical force structure, the U.S. Air Force decided to adopt a low-cost aircraft to supplement the F-4 and F-111. It first focused on the Northrop F-5, which had air-to-air capability. A 1965 cost-effectiveness study shifted the focus from the F-5 to the less expensive A-7D variant of the LTV A-7 Corsair II, and a contract was awarded. However, this aircraft doubled in cost with demands for an upgraded engine and new avionics.

Army helicopter competition

During this period, the United States Army had been introducing the Bell UH-1 Iroquois into service. First used in its intended role as a transport, it was soon modified in the field to carry more machine guns in what became known as the helicopter gunship role. This proved effective against the lightly armed enemy, and new gun and rocket pods were added. Soon the Bell AH-1 Cobra was introduced. This was an attack helicopter armed with long-range BGM-71 TOW missiles able to destroy tanks from outside the range of defensive fire. The helicopter was effective and prompted the U.S. military to change its defensive strategy in Europe into blunting any Warsaw Pact advance with anti-tank helicopters instead of the tactical nuclear weapons that had been the basis for NATO's battle plans since the 1950s.

The Cobra was a quickly-made helicopter based on the UH-1 Iroquois and was introduced in the mid-1960s as an interim design until the U.S. Army  "Advanced Aerial Fire Support System" program delivered. The Army selected the Lockheed AH-56 Cheyenne, a much more capable attack aircraft with greater speed for initial production. These developments worried the USAF, which saw the anti-tank helicopter overtaking its nuclear-armed tactical aircraft as the primary anti-armor force in Europe. A 1966 Air Force study of existing close air support (CAS) capabilities revealed gaps in the escort and fire suppression roles, which the Cheyenne could fill. The study concluded that the service should acquire a simple, inexpensive, dedicated CAS aircraft at least as capable as the A-1, and that it should develop doctrine, tactics, and procedures for such aircraft to accomplish the missions for which the attack helicopters were provided.

A-X program
On 8 September 1966, General John P. McConnell, Chief of Staff of the USAF, ordered that a specialized CAS aircraft be designed, developed, and obtained. On 22 December, a Requirements Action Directive was issued for the A-X CAS airplane, and the Attack Experimental (A-X) program office was formed. On 6 March 1967, the Air Force released a request for information to 21 defense contractors for the A-X.

In May 1970, the USAF issued a modified, more detailed request for proposals for the aircraft. The threat of Soviet armored forces and all-weather attack operations had become more serious. The requirements now included that the aircraft would be designed specifically for the 30 mm rotary cannon. The A-X would be the first USAF aircraft designed exclusively for close air support. During this time, a separate RFP was released for A-X's 30 mm cannon with requirements for a high rate of fire (4,000 round per minute) and a high muzzle velocity. Six companies submitted aircraft proposals, with Northrop and Fairchild Republic selected to build prototypes: the YA-9A and YA-10A, respectively. General Electric and Philco-Ford were selected to build and test GAU-8 cannon prototypes.

Two YA-10 prototypes were built in the Republic factory in Farmingdale, New York, and first flown on 10 May 1972 by pilot Howard "Sam" Nelson. Production A-10s were built by Fairchild in Hagerstown, Maryland. After trials and a fly-off against the YA-9, on 18 January 1973, the USAF announced the YA-10's selection for production. General Electric was selected to build the GAU-8 cannon in June 1973. The YA-10 had an additional fly-off in 1974 against the Ling-Temco-Vought A-7D Corsair II, the principal USAF attack aircraft at the time, to prove the need for a new attack aircraft. The first production A-10 flew in October 1975, and deliveries commenced in March 1976.

One experimental two-seat A-10 Night Adverse Weather (N/AW) version was built by converting an A-10A. The N/AW was developed by Fairchild from the first Demonstration Testing and Evaluation (DT&E) A-10 for consideration by the USAF. It included a second seat for a weapon systems officer responsible for electronic countermeasures (ECM), navigation and target acquisition. The N/AW version did not interest the USAF or export customers. The two-seat trainer version was ordered by the Air Force in 1981, but funding was canceled by U.S. Congress and the trainer was not produced. The only two-seat A-10 resides at Edwards Air Force Base's Flight Test Center Museum.

Production
On 10 February 1976, Deputy Secretary of Defense Bill Clements authorized full-rate production, with the first A-10 being accepted by the Air Force Tactical Air Command on 30 March 1976.  Production continued and reached a peak rate of 13 aircraft per month.  By 1984, 715 airplanes, including two prototypes and six development aircraft, had been delivered.

When A-10 full-rate production was first authorized the aircraft's planned service life was 6,000 hours. A small reinforcement to the design was quickly adopted when the A-10 failed initial fatigue testing at 80% of testing; with the fix, the A-10 passed the fatigue tests. 8,000-flight-hour service lives were becoming common at the time, so fatigue testing of the A-10 continued with a new 8,000-hour target. This new target quickly discovered serious cracks at Wing Station 23 (WS23) where the outboard portions of the wings are joined to the fuselage. The first production change was to add cold working at WS23 to address this problem.  Soon after, the Air Force determined that the real-world A-10 fleet fatigue was more harsh than estimated, forcing them to change their fatigue testing and introduce "spectrum 3" equivalent flight-hour testing.

Spectrum 3 fatigue testing started in 1979. This round of testing quickly determined that more drastic reinforcement would be needed.  The second change in production, starting with aircraft No. 442, was to increase the thickness of the lower skin on the outer wing panels.  A tech order was issued to retrofit the "thick skin" to the whole fleet, but the tech order was rescinded after roughly 242 planes, leaving about 200 planes with the original "thin skin".  Starting with aircraft No. 530, cold working at WS0 was performed, and this retrofit was performed on earlier aircraft.  A fourth, even more drastic change was initiated with aircraft No. 582, again to address the problems discovered with spectrum 3 testing.  This change increased the thickness of the lower skin on the center wing panel, but it required modifications to the lower spar caps to accommodate the thicker skin.  The Air Force determined that it was not economically feasible to retrofit earlier planes with this modification.

Upgrades

The A-10 has received many upgrades since entering service.  In 1978, the A-10 received the Pave Penny laser receiver pod, which receives reflected laser radiation from laser designators to allow the aircraft to deliver laser guided munitions. The Pave Penny pod is carried on a pylon mounted below the right side of the cockpit and has a clear view of the ground. In 1980, the A-10 began receiving an inertial navigation system.

In the early 1990s, the A-10 began to receive the Low-Altitude Safety and Targeting Enhancement (LASTE) upgrade, which provided computerized weapon-aiming equipment, an autopilot, and a ground-collision warning system. In 1999, aircraft began receiving Global Positioning System navigation systems and a multi-function display. The LASTE system was upgraded with an Integrated Flight & Fire Control Computer (IFFCC).

Proposed further upgrades included integrated combat search and rescue locator systems and improved early warning and anti-jam self-protection systems, and the Air Force recognized that the A-10's engine power was sub-optimal and had been planning to replace them with more powerful engines since at least 2001 at an estimated cost of $2 billion.

HOG UP and Wing Replacement Program
In 1987, Grumman Aerospace took over support for the A-10 program. In 1993, Grumman updated the damage tolerance assessment and Force Structural Maintenance Plan and Damage Threat Assessment. Over the next few years, problems with wing structure fatigue, first noticed in production years earlier, began to come to the fore. The process of implementing the maintenance plan was greatly delayed by the base realignment and closure commission (BRAC), which led to 80% of the original workforce being let go.

During inspections in 1995 and 1996, cracks at the WS23 location were found on many aircraft, most of them in line with updated predictions from 1993. However, two of these were classified as "near-critical" size, well beyond predictions. In August 1998, Grumman produced a new plan to address these issues and increase life span to 16,000 hours. This resulted in the "HOG UP" program, which commenced in 1999. Over time, additional aspects were added to HOG UP, including new fuel bladders, changes to the flight control system, and inspections of the engine nacelles. In 2001, the cracks were reclassified as "critical", which meant they were considered repairs and not upgrades, which allowed bypassing normal acquisition channels for more rapid implementation.

An independent review of the HOG UP program at this point concluded that the data on which the wing upgrade relied could no longer be trusted.  This independent review was presented in September 2003.  Shortly thereafter, fatigue testing on a test wing failed prematurely and also mounting problems with wings failing in-service inspections at an increasing rate became apparent.  The Air Force estimated that they would run out of wings by 2011.  Of the plans explored, replacing the wings with new ones was the least expensive, with an initial cost of $741 million, and a total cost of $1.72 billion over the life of the program.

In 2005, a business case was developed with three options to extend the life of the fleet. The first two options involved expanding the service life extension program (SLEP) at a cost of $4.6 billion and $3.16 billion, respectively. The third option, worth $1.72 billion, was to build 242 new wings and avoid the cost of expanding the SLEP. In 2006, option 3 was chosen and Boeing won the contract. The base contract is for 117 wings with options for 125 additional wings. In 2013, the Air Force exercised a portion of the option to add 56 wings, putting 173 wings on order with options remaining for 69 additional wings. In November 2011, two A-10s flew with the new wings fitted. The new wings improved mission readiness, decreased maintenance costs, and allowed the A-10 to be operated up to 2035 if necessary. The re-winging effort was organized under the Thick-skin Urgent Spares Kitting (TUSK) Program.

In 2014, as part of plans to retire the A-10, the USAF considered halting the wing replacement program to save an additional $500 million; however, by May 2015 the re-winging program was too far into the contract to be financially efficient to cancel. Boeing stated in February 2016 that the A-10 fleet with the new TUSK wings could operate to 2040.

Modernization (A-10C)

In 2005, the entire fleet of 356 A-10 and OA-10 aircraft began receiving the Precision Engagement upgrades including an improved fire control system (FCS), electronic countermeasures (ECM), smart bomb targeting, and cockpit upgrades comprising new multi-function displays and HOTAS. The aircraft receiving this upgrade were redesignated A-10C. The Government Accountability Office in 2007 estimated the cost of upgrading, refurbishing, and service life extension plans for the A-10 force to total $2.25 billion through 2013. In July 2010, the USAF issued Raytheon a contract to integrate a Helmet Mounted Integrated Targeting (HMIT) system into the A-10C. The Air Force Materiel Command's Ogden Air Logistics Center at Hill AFB, Utah completed work on its 100th A-10 precision engagement upgrade in January 2008. The final aircraft was upgraded to A-10C configuration in June 2011. The aircraft also received all-weather combat capability, and a Hand-on-Throttle-and-Stick configuration mixing the F-16's flight stick with the F-15's throttle.  Other changes included two multifunction displays, a modern communications suite including a Link-16 radio and SATCOM. The LASTE system was replaced with the integrated flight and fire control computer (IFFCC) included in the PE upgrade.

Throughout its life, the platform's software has been upgraded several times, and although these upgrades were due to be stopped as part of plans to retire the A-10 in February 2014, Secretary of the Air Force Deborah Lee James ordered that the latest upgrade, designated Suite 8, continue in response to Congressional pressure. Suite 8 software includes IFF Mode 5, which modernizes the ability to identify the A-10 to friendly units. Additionally, the Pave Penny pods and pylons are being removed as their receive-only capability has been replaced by the AN/AAQ-28(V)4 LITENING AT targeting pods or Sniper XR targeting pod, which both have laser designators and laser rangefinders.

In 2012, Air Combat Command requested the testing of a  external fuel tank which would extend the A-10's loitering time by 45–60 minutes; flight testing of such a tank had been conducted in 1997 but did not involve combat evaluation. Over 30 flight tests were conducted by the 40th Flight Test Squadron to gather data on the aircraft's handling characteristics and performance across different load configurations. It was reported that the tank slightly reduced stability in the yaw axis, but there was no decrease in aircraft tracking performance.

Design

Overview

The A-10 has a cantilever low-wing monoplane wing with a wide chord. The aircraft has superior maneuverability at low speeds and altitude because of its large wing area, high wing aspect ratio, and large ailerons. The wing also allows short takeoffs and landings, permitting operations from primitive forward airfields near front lines. The aircraft can loiter for extended periods and operate under  ceilings with  visibility.

The leading edge of the wing has a honeycomb structure panel construction, providing strength with minimal weight; similar panels cover the flap shrouds, elevators, rudders and sections of the fins. The skin panels are integral with the stringers and are fabricated using computer-controlled machining, reducing production time and cost. Combat experience has shown that this type of panel is more resistant to damage. The skin is not load-bearing, so damaged skin sections can be easily replaced in the field, with makeshift materials if necessary. The ailerons are at the far ends of the wings for greater rolling moment and have two distinguishing features: The ailerons are larger than is typical, almost 50 percent of the wingspan, providing improved control even at slow speeds; the aileron is also split, making it a deceleron.

The A-10 is designed to be refueled, rearmed, and serviced with minimal equipment. Its simple design enables maintenance at forward bases with limited facilities. An unusual feature is that many of the aircraft's parts are interchangeable between the left and right sides, including the engines, main landing gear, and vertical stabilizers. The sturdy landing gear, low-pressure tires and large, straight wings allow operation from short rough strips even with a heavy aircraft ordnance load, allowing the aircraft to operate from damaged airbases, flying from taxiways, or even straight roadway sections.

The front landing gear is offset to the aircraft's right to allow placement of the 30 mm cannon with its firing barrel along the centerline of the aircraft. During ground taxi, the offset front landing gear causes the A-10 to have dissimilar turning radii; turning to the right on the ground takes less distance than turning left. The wheels of the main landing gear partially protrude from their nacelles when retracted, making gear-up belly landings easier to control and less damaging. All landing gears retract forward; if hydraulic power is lost, a combination of gravity and aerodynamic drag can lower and lock the gear in place.

Survivability
The A-10 is battle-hardened to an exceptional degree, being able to survive direct hits from armor-piercing and high-explosive projectiles up to 23 mm. It has double-redundant hydraulic flight systems, and a mechanical system as a backup if hydraulics are lost. Flight without hydraulic power uses the manual reversion control system; pitch and yaw control engages automatically, roll control is pilot-selected. In manual reversion mode, the A-10 is sufficiently controllable under favorable conditions to return to base, though control forces are greater than normal. The aircraft is designed to be able to fly with one engine, half of the tail, one elevator, and half of a wing missing.

The armor has been tested to withstand strikes from 23 mm cannon fire and some indirect hits from 57 mm shell fragments. It is made up of titanium plates with thicknesses varying from  determined by a study of likely trajectories and deflection angles. The armor makes up almost six percent of the aircraft's empty weight. Any interior surface of the tub directly exposed to the pilot is covered by a multi-layer nylon spall shield to protect against shell fragmentation. The front windscreen and canopy are resistant to small arms fire.

The A-10's durability was demonstrated on 7 April 2003 when Captain Kim Campbell, while flying over Baghdad during the 2003 invasion of Iraq, suffered extensive flak damage. Iraqi fire damaged one of her engines and crippled the hydraulic system, requiring the aircraft's stabilizer and flight controls to be operated via the 'manual reversion mode.' Despite this damage, Campbell flew the aircraft for nearly an hour and landed safely.

The A-10 was intended to fly from forward air bases and semi-prepared runways where foreign object damage to an aircraft's engines is normally a high risk. The unusual location of the General Electric TF34-GE-100 turbofan engines decreases ingestion risk and also allows the engines to run while the aircraft is serviced and rearmed by ground crews, reducing turn-around time. The wings are also mounted closer to the ground, simplifying servicing and rearming operations. The aircraft's heavy engines require strong support: four bolts connect the engine pylons to the airframe. The engines' high 6:1 bypass ratio contributes to a relatively small infrared signature, and their position directs exhaust over the tailplanes further shielding it from detection by infrared homing surface-to-air missiles. The engines' exhaust nozzles are angled nine degrees below horizontal to cancel out the nose-down pitching moment that would otherwise be generated from being mounted above the aircraft's center of gravity and avoid the need to trim the control surfaces to prevent pitching.

To reduce the likelihood of damage to the A-10's fuel system, all four fuel tanks are located near the aircraft's center and are separated from the fuselage; projectiles would need to penetrate the aircraft's skin before reaching a fuel tank's outer skin. Compromised fuel transfer lines self-seal; if damage exceeds a tank's self-sealing capabilities, check valves prevent fuel from flowing into a compromised tank. Most fuel system components are inside the tanks so that fuel will not be lost due to component failure. The refueling system is also purged after use. Reticulated polyurethane foam lines both the inner and outer sides of the fuel tanks, retaining debris and restricting fuel spillage in the event of damage. The engines are shielded from the rest of the airframe by firewalls and fire extinguishing equipment. In the event of all four main tanks being lost, two self-sealing sump tanks contain fuel for 230 miles (370 km) of flight.

Since the A-10 operates very close to enemy positions, where it is an easy target for man-portable air-defense system (MANPADS), surface-to-air missiles (SAMs), and enemy aircraft, it carries both flares and chaff cartridges.

Weapons

Although the A-10 can carry a considerable amount of munitions, its primary built-in weapon is the 30×173 mm GAU-8/A Avenger autocannon. One of the most powerful aircraft cannons ever flown, it fires large depleted uranium armor-piercing shells. The GAU-8 is a hydraulically driven seven-barrel rotary cannon designed specifically for the anti-tank role with a high rate of fire. The cannon's original design could be switched by the pilot to 2,100 or 4,200 rounds per minute; this was later changed to a fixed rate of 3,900 rounds per minute. The cannon takes about half a second to reach top speed, so 50 rounds are fired during the first second, 65 or 70 rounds per second thereafter. The gun is accurate enough to place 80 percent of its shots within a 40-foot (12.4 m) diameter circle from 4,000 feet (1,220 m) while in flight.

The fuselage of the aircraft is built around the cannon. The GAU-8/A is mounted slightly to the port side; the barrel in the firing location is on the starboard side so it is aligned with the aircraft's centerline. The gun's 5-foot, 11.5-inch (1.816 m) ammunition drum can hold up to 1,350 rounds of 30 mm ammunition, but generally holds 1,174 rounds. To protect the GAU-8/A rounds from enemy fire, armor plates of differing thicknesses between the aircraft skin and the drum are designed to detonate incoming shells.

The AGM-65 Maverick air-to-surface missile is a commonly used munition for the A-10, targeted via electro-optical (TV-guided) or infrared. The Maverick allows target engagement at much greater ranges than the cannon, and thus less risk from anti-aircraft systems. During Desert Storm, in the absence of dedicated forward-looking infrared (FLIR) cameras for night vision, the Maverick's infrared camera was used for night missions as a "poor man's FLIR". Other weapons include cluster bombs and Hydra 70 rocket pods. The A-10 is equipped to carry GPS- and laser-guided bombs, such as the GBU-39 Small Diameter Bomb, Paveway series bombs, Joint Direct Attack Munitions (JDAM), Wind Corrected Munitions Dispenser and AGM-154 Joint Standoff Weapon glide bombs. A-10s usually fly with an ALQ-131 Electronic countermeasures (ECM) pod under one wing and two AIM-9 Sidewinder air-to-air missiles for self-defense under the other wing.

Colors and markings

Since the A-10 flies low to the ground and at subsonic speed, aircraft camouflage is important to make the aircraft more difficult to see. Many different types of paint schemes have been tried. These have included a "peanut scheme" of sand, yellow, and field drab; black and white colors for winter operations and a tan, green, and brown mixed pattern. Many A-10s also featured a false canopy painted in dark gray on the underside of the aircraft, just behind the gun. This form of automimicry is an attempt to confuse the enemy as to aircraft attitude and maneuver direction. Many A-10s feature nose art, such as shark mouth or warthog head features.

The two most common markings applied to the A-10 have been the European I woodland camouflage scheme and a two-tone gray scheme. The European woodland scheme was designed to minimize visibility from above, as the threat from hostile fighter aircraft was felt to outweigh that from ground fire. It uses dark green, medium green, and dark gray to blend in with the typical European forest terrain and was used from the 1980s to the early 1990s. Following the end of the Cold War, and based on experience during the 1991 Gulf War, the air-to-air threat was no longer seen to be as important as that from ground fire, and a new color scheme known as "Compass Ghost" was chosen to minimize visibility from below. This two-tone gray scheme has darker gray color on top, with a lighter gray on the underside of the aircraft, and started to be applied in the early 1990s.

Operational history

Entering service

The first unit to receive the A-10 Thunderbolt II was the 355th Tactical Training Wing, based at Davis-Monthan Air Force Base, Arizona, in March 1976. The first unit to achieve full combat readiness was the 354th Tactical Fighter Wing at Myrtle Beach Air Force Base, South Carolina, in October 1977. Deployments of A-10As followed at bases both at home and abroad, including England AFB, Louisiana; Eielson AFB, Alaska; Osan Air Base, South Korea; and RAF Bentwaters/RAF Woodbridge, England. The 81st TFW of RAF Bentwaters/RAF Woodbridge operated rotating detachments of A-10s at four bases in Germany known as Forward Operating Locations (FOLs): Leipheim, Sembach Air Base, Nörvenich Air Base, and RAF Ahlhorn.

A-10s were initially an unwelcome addition to many in the Air Force. Most pilots switching to the A-10 did not want to because fighter pilots traditionally favored speed and appearance. In 1987, many A-10s were shifted to the forward air control (FAC) role and redesignated OA-10. In the FAC role, the OA-10 is typically equipped with up to six pods of 2.75 inch (70 mm) Hydra rockets, usually with smoke or white phosphorus warheads used for target marking. OA-10s are physically unchanged and remain fully combat capable despite the redesignation.

A-10s of the 23rd TFW were deployed to Bridgetown, Barbados during Operation Urgent Fury, the 1983 American Invasion of Grenada. They provided air cover for the U.S. Marine Corps landings on the island of Carriacou in late October 1983, but did not fire weapons as Marines met no resistance.

Gulf War and Balkans

The A-10 was used in combat for the first time during the Gulf War in 1991, with 132 being deployed. A-10s shot down two Iraqi helicopters with the GAU-8 cannon. The first of these was shot down by Captain Robert Swain over Kuwait on 6 February 1991 for the A-10's first air-to-air victory. Four A-10s were shot down during the war by surface-to-air missiles and eleven A-10s were hit by anti-air artillery rounds. Another two battle-damaged A-10s and OA-10As returned to base and were written off. Some sustained additional damage in crash landings. At the beginning of the war, A-10s flew missions against the Iraqi Republican Guard, but due to heavy attrition, from 15 February they were restricted to within 20 nautical miles (37 km) of the southern border.  A-10s also flew missions hunting Iraqi Scud missiles.  The A-10 had a mission capable rate of 95.7 percent, flew 8,100 sorties, and launched 90 percent of the AGM-65 Maverick missiles fired in the conflict. Shortly after the Gulf War, the Air Force abandoned the idea of replacing the A-10 with a close air support version of the F-16.

U.S. Air Force A-10 aircraft fired approximately 10,000 30 mm rounds in Bosnia and Herzegovina in 1994–95. Following the seizure of some heavy weapons by Bosnian Serbs from a warehouse in Ilidža, a series of sorties were launched to locate and destroy the captured equipment. On 5 August 1994, two A-10s located and strafed an anti-tank vehicle. Afterward, the Serbs agreed to return the remaining heavy weapons. In August 1995, NATO launched an offensive called Operation Deliberate Force. A-10s flew close air support missions, attacking Bosnian Serb artillery and positions. In late September, A-10s began flying patrols again.

A-10s returned to the Balkan region as part of Operation Allied Force in Kosovo beginning in March 1999. In March 1999, A-10s escorted and supported search and rescue helicopters in finding a downed F-117 pilot. The A-10s were deployed to support search and rescue missions, but over time the Warthogs began to receive more ground attack missions. The A-10's first successful attack in Operation Allied Force happened on 6 April 1999; A-10s remained in action until the combat ended in late June 1999.

Afghanistan, Iraq, Libya, and recent deployments

During the 2001 invasion of Afghanistan, A-10s did not take part in the initial stages. For the campaign against Taliban and Al Qaeda, A-10 squadrons were deployed to Pakistan and Bagram Air Base, Afghanistan, beginning in March 2002. These A-10s participated in Operation Anaconda. Afterward, A-10s remained in-country, fighting Taliban and Al Qaeda remnants.

Operation Iraqi Freedom began on 20 March 2003. Sixty OA-10/A-10 aircraft took part in early combat there. United States Air Forces Central Command issued Operation Iraqi Freedom: By the Numbers, a declassified report about the aerial campaign in the conflict on 30 April 2003. During that initial invasion of Iraq, A-10s had a mission capable rate of 85 percent in the war and fired 311,597 rounds of 30 mm ammunition. A single A-10 was shot down near Baghdad International Airport by Iraqi fire late in the campaign. The A-10 also flew 32 missions in which the aircraft dropped propaganda leaflets over Iraq.

In September 2007, the A-10C with the Precision Engagement Upgrade reached initial operating capability. The A-10C first deployed to Iraq in 2007 with the 104th Fighter Squadron of the Maryland Air National Guard. The A-10C's digital avionics and communications systems have greatly reduced the time to acquire a close air support target and attack it.

A-10s flew 32 percent of combat sorties in Operation Iraqi Freedom and Operation Enduring Freedom. The sorties ranged from 27,800 to 34,500 annually between 2009 and 2012. In the first half of 2013, they flew 11,189 sorties in Afghanistan. From the beginning of 2006 to October 2013, A-10s conducted 19 percent of CAS missions in Iraq and Afghanistan, more than the F-15E Strike Eagle and B-1B Lancer, but less than the 33 percent flown by F-16s.

In March 2011, six A-10s were deployed as part of Operation Odyssey Dawn, the coalition intervention in Libya. They participated in attacks on Libyan ground forces there.

The USAF 122nd Fighter Wing revealed it would deploy to the Middle East in October 2014 with 12 of the unit's 21 A-10 aircraft. Although the deployment had been planned a year in advance in a support role, the timing coincided with the ongoing Operation Inherent Resolve against ISIL militants. From mid-November, U.S. commanders began sending A-10s to hit IS targets in central and northwestern Iraq on an almost daily basis. In about two months time, A-10s flew 11 percent of all USAF sorties since the start of operations in August 2014. On 15 November 2015, two days after the ISIL attacks in Paris, A-10s and AC-130s destroyed a convoy of over 100 ISIL-operated oil tanker trucks in Syria.  The attacks were part of an intensification of the U.S.-led intervention against ISIL called Operation Tidal Wave II (named after Operation Tidal Wave during World War II, a failed attempt to raid German oil fields) in an attempt to cut off oil smuggling as a source of funding for the group.

The A-10 has been involved in killing ten U.S. troops in friendly-fire over four incidents between 2001 to 2015 and 35 Afghan civilians from 2010 to 2015, more than any other U.S. military aircraft; these incidents have been assessed as "inconclusive and statistically insignificant" in terms of the warplane's capability.

On 19 January 2018, 12 A-10s from the 303d Expeditionary Fighter Squadron were deployed to Kandahar Airfield, Afghanistan, to provide close-air support, marking the first time in more than three years A-10s had been deployed to Afghanistan.

Future

The future of the platform remains the subject of debate. In 2007, the USAF expected the A-10 to remain in service until 2028 and possibly later, when it would likely be replaced by the Lockheed Martin F-35 Lightning II. However, critics have said that replacing the A-10 with the F-35 would be a "giant leap backwards" given the A-10's performance and the F-35's high costs. In 2012, the Air Force considered the F-35B STOVL variant as a replacement CAS aircraft, but concluded that the aircraft could not generate sufficient sorties. In August 2013, Congress and the Air Force examined various proposals, including the F-35 and the MQ-9 Reaper unmanned aerial vehicle filling the A-10's role. Proponents state that the A-10's armor and cannon are superior to aircraft such as the F-35 for ground attack, that guided munitions other planes rely upon could be jammed, and that ground commanders frequently request A-10 support.

In the USAF's FY 2015 budget, the service considered retiring the A-10 and other single-mission aircraft, prioritizing multi-mission aircraft; cutting a whole fleet and its infrastructure was seen as the only method for major savings. The U.S. Army had expressed interest in obtaining some A-10s should the Air Force retire them, but later stated there was "no chance" of that happening. The U.S. Air Force stated that retirement would save $3.7 billion from 2015 to 2019. The prevalence of guided munitions allows more aircraft to perform the CAS mission and reduces the requirement for specialized aircraft; since 2001 multirole aircraft and bombers have performed 80 percent of operational CAS missions. The Air Force also said that the A-10 was more vulnerable to advanced anti-aircraft defenses, but the Army replied that the A-10 had proved invaluable because of its versatile weapons loads, psychological impact, and limited logistics needs on ground support systems.

In January 2015, USAF officials told lawmakers that it would take 15 years to fully develop a new attack aircraft to replace the A-10; that year General Herbert J. Carlisle, the head of Air Combat Command, stated that a follow-on weapon system for the A-10 may need to be developed. It planned for F-16s and F-15Es to initially take up CAS sorties, and later by the F-35A once sufficient numbers become operationally available over the next decade. In July 2015, Boeing held initial discussions on the prospects of selling retired or stored A-10s in near-flyaway condition to international customers. However, the Air Force then said that it would not permit the aircraft to be sold.

Plans to develop a replacement aircraft were announced by the US Air Combat Command in August 2015. Early the following year, the Air Force began studying future CAS aircraft to succeed the A-10 in low-intensity "permissive conflicts" like counterterrorism and regional stability operations, admitting that the F-35 would be too expensive to operate in day-to-day roles. A wide range of platforms were under consideration, including everything from low-end AT-6 Wolverine and A-29 Super Tucano turboprops and the Textron AirLand Scorpion as more basic off-the-shelf options to more sophisticated clean-sheet attack aircraft or "AT-X" derivatives of the T-X next-generation trainer as entirely new attack platforms.

In January 2016, the USAF was "indefinitely freezing" plans to retire the A-10 for at least several years. In addition to Congressional opposition, its use in anti-ISIS operations, deployments to Eastern Europe as a response to Russia's military intervention in Ukraine, and reevaluation of F-35 numbers necessitated its retention. In February 2016, the Air Force deferred the final retirement of the aircraft until 2022 after being replaced by F-35s on a squadron-by-squadron basis. In October 2016, the Air Force Materiel Command brought the depot maintenance line back to full capacity in preparation for re-winging the fleet. In June 2017, it was announced that the aircraft "...will now be kept in the air force’s inventory indefinitely." The 2022 Russian invasion of Ukraine spurred some American observers to push for the loaning of A-10s to Ukraine, particularly following reports of an extended, stalled Russian convoy outside Kyiv, with critics of such a proposal noting the diplomatic and tactical complications to such an approach.

During an interview in December 2022, Ukrainian Defence Minister Oleksii Reznikov said that in late March he asked the US Secretary of Defence Lloyd Austin for 100 surplus A-10s. Saying "We had done our homework. They can deliver heavier bombs, and we could use them against [Russian] tank columns". However, Secretary Austin reportedly told Minister Reznikov that the plan was "impossible", and that the "old-fashioned and slow" planes would be a "squeaky target" for Russian air defenses.

Other uses

On 25 March 2010, an A-10 conducted the first flight of an aircraft with all engines powered by a biofuel blend. The flight, performed at Eglin Air Force Base, used a 1:1 blend of JP-8 and Camelina-based fuel. On 28 June 2012, the A-10 became the first aircraft to fly using a new fuel blend derived from alcohol; known as ATJ (Alcohol-to-Jet), the fuel is cellulosic-based and can be produced using wood, paper, grass, or any cellulose-based material, which are fermented into alcohols before being hydro-processed into aviation fuel. ATJ is the third alternative fuel to be evaluated by the Air Force as a replacement for the petroleum-derived JP-8 fuel. Previous types were synthetic paraffinic kerosene derived from coal and natural gas and a bio-mass fuel derived from plant oils and animal fats known as Hydroprocessed Renewable Jet.

In 2011, the National Science Foundation granted $11 million to modify an A-10 for weather research for CIRPAS at the U.S. Naval Postgraduate School and in collaboration with scientists from the South Dakota School of Mines & Technology (SDSM&T), replacing SDSM&T's retired North American T-28 Trojan. The A-10's armor is expected to allow it to survive extreme meteorological conditions, such as 200 mph hailstorms, found in inclement high-altitude weather events. In 2018, this plan was found to carry too many risks associated with the costly modifications required, and the program was canceled.

Variants

YA-10A Pre-production variant. 12 were built.
A-10A Single-seat close air support, ground-attack production version.
OA-10A A-10As used for airborne forward air control.
YA-10B Night/Adverse Weather (N/AW) Two-seat experimental prototype, for work at night and in bad weather. The one YA-10B prototype was converted from an A-10A.
A-10C A-10As updated under the incremental Precision Engagement (PE) program.
A-10PCAS Proposed unmanned version developed by Raytheon and Aurora Flight Sciences as part of DARPA's Persistent Close Air Support program. The PCAS program eventually dropped the idea of using an optionally manned A-10.
SPA-10 Proposed by the South Dakota School of Mines and Technology to replace its North American T-28 Trojan thunderstorm penetration aircraft. The A-10 would have its military engines, avionics, and oxygen system replaced by civilian versions. The engines and airframe would receive protection from hail, and the GAU-8 Avenger would be replaced with ballast or scientific instruments.  Project canceled after partial modification of a single A-10C.

Operators

The A-10 has been flown exclusively by the United States Air Force and its Air Reserve components, the Air Force Reserve Command (AFRC) and the Air National Guard (ANG). , 282 A-10C aircraft are reported as operational, divided as follows: 141 USAF, 55 AFRC, 86 ANG.

United States Air Force
Air Force Materiel Command
 514th Flight Test Squadron (Hill AFB, Utah) (1993-)
23rd Wing
74th Fighter Squadron (Moody AFB, Georgia) (1980–1992, 1996–)
 75th Fighter Squadron (Moody AFB, Georgia) (1980–1991, 1992–)
 51st Fighter Wing
 25th Fighter Squadron (Osan AFB, South Korea) (1982–1989, 1993–)
 53d Wing
 422d Test and Evaluation Squadron (Nellis AFB, Nevada) (1977–)
 57th Wing
 66th Weapons Squadron (Nellis AFB, Nevada) (1977–1981, 2003–)
96th Test Wing
40th Flight Test Squadron (Eglin AFB, Florida) (1982–)
 122nd Fighter Wing (Indiana ANG)
 163d Fighter Squadron (Fort Wayne ANGS, Indiana) (2010–)
 124th Fighter Wing (Idaho ANG)
 190th Fighter Squadron (Gowen Field ANGB, Idaho) (1996–)
 127th Wing (Michigan ANG)
 107th Fighter Squadron (Selfridge ANGB, Michigan) (2008–)
 175th Wing (Maryland ANG)
 104th Fighter Squadron (Warfield ANGB, Maryland) (1979–)
 355th Fighter Wing
 354th Fighter Squadron (Davis-Monthan AFB, Arizona) (1979–1982, 1991–)
 357th Fighter Squadron (Davis-Monthan AFB, Arizona) (1979–)
 442nd Fighter Wing (AFRC)
 303d Fighter Squadron (Whiteman AFB, Missouri) (1982–)
 476th Fighter Group (AFRC)
 76th Fighter Squadron (Moody AFB, Georgia) (1981–1992, 2009–)
 495th Fighter Group (AFRC)
 358th Fighter Squadron (Whiteman AFB, Missouri) (1979–2014, 2015–)
924th Fighter Group (AFRC)
 45th Fighter Squadron (Davis-Monthan AFB, Arizona) (1981–1994, 2009–)
 47th Fighter Squadron (Davis-Monthan AFB, Arizona) (1980–)
926th Wing (AFRC)
 706th Fighter Squadron (Nellis AFB, Nevada) (1982–1992, 1997–2007, 2007–present)

Former squadrons
18th Tactical Fighter Squadron (1982–1991)
23d Tactical Air Support Squadron (1987–1991) (OA-10 unit)
55th Tactical Fighter Squadron (1994–1996)
70th Fighter Squadron (1995–2000)
78th Tactical Fighter Squadron (1979–1992)
81st Fighter Squadron (1994–2013)
91st Tactical Fighter Squadron (1978–1992)
92d Tactical Fighter Squadron (1978–1993)
103d Fighter Squadron (Pennsylvania ANG) (1988–2011) (OA-10 unit)
118th Fighter Squadron (Connecticut ANG) (1979–2008)
131st Fighter Squadron (Massachusetts ANG) (1979–2007)
138th Fighter Squadron (New York ANG) (1979–1989)
172d Fighter Squadron (Michigan ANG) (1991–2009)
176th Tactical Fighter Squadron (Wisconsin ANG) (1981–1993)
184th Fighter Squadron (Arkansas ANG) (2007–2014)
353d Tactical Fighter Squadron (1978–1992)
355th Tactical Fighter Squadron (1978–1992, 1993–2007)
356th Tactical Fighter Squadron (1977–1992)
509th Tactical Fighter Squadron (1979–1992)
510th Tactical Fighter Squadron (1979–1994)
511th Tactical Fighter Squadron (1980–1992)

Aircraft on display

Germany
A-10A
 77-0264 – Spangdahlem AB, Bitburg

South Korea
A-10A
 76-0515 – Osan AB

United Kingdom
A-10A
 77-0259 – American Air Museum at Imperial War Museum Duxford
 80-0219 – Bentwaters Cold War Museum

United States
YA-10A
 71-1370 – Joint Base Langley-Eustis (Langley AFB), Hampton, Virginia
YA-10B
 73-1664 – Air Force Flight Test Center Museum, Edwards AFB, California
A-10A
 73-1666 – Hill Aerospace Museum, Hill AFB, Utah

 73-1667 – Flying Tiger Heritage Park at the former England AFB, Louisiana
 75-0263 – Empire State Aerosciences Museum, Glenville, New York
 75-0270 – McChord Air Museum, McChord AFB, Washington
 75-0293 – Wings of Eagles Discovery Center, Elmira, New York
 75-0288 – Air Force Armament Museum, Eglin AFB, Florida
 75-0289 – Heritage Park, Eielson AFB, Alaska
 75-0298 – Pima Air & Space Museum (adjacent to Davis-Monthan AFB), Tucson, Arizona

 75-0305 – Museum of Aviation, Robins AFB, Warner Robins, Georgia
 75-0308 – Moody Heritage Park, Moody AFB, Valdosta, Georgia
 75-0309 – Shaw AFB, Sumter, South Carolina.  Marked as AF Ser. No. 81-0964 assigned to the 55 FS from 1994 to 1996. The represented aircraft was credited with downing an Iraqi Mi-8 Hip helicopter on 15 February 1991 while assigned to the 511 TFS.
 76-0516 – Wings of Freedom Aviation Museum at the former NAS Willow Grove, Horsham, Pennsylvania
 76-0530 – Whiteman AFB, Missouri
 76-0535 – Cradle of Aviation, Garden City, New York
 76-0540 – Aerospace Museum of California, McClellan Airport (former McClellan AFB), Sacramento, California
 77-0199 – Stafford Air & Space Museum, Weatherford, Oklahoma
 77-0205 – USAF Academy collection, Colorado Springs, Colorado
 77-0228 – Grissom Air Museum, Grissom ARB (former Grissom AFB), Peru, Indiana
 77-0244 – Wisconsin Air National Guard Museum, Volk Field ANGB, Wisconsin
 77-0252 – Cradle of Aviation, Garden City, New York (nose section only)
 77-0667 – England AFB Heritage Park, Alexandria, Louisiana
 78-0681 – National Museum of the United States Air Force, Wright-Patterson AFB, Dayton, Ohio
 78-0687 – Don F. Pratt Memorial Museum, Fort Campbell, Kentucky
 79-0097 – Warbird Park, former Myrtle Beach Air Force Base, South Carolina
 79-0100 – Barnes Air National Guard Base, Westfield, Massachusetts
 79-0103 – Bradley Air National Guard Base, Windsor Locks, Connecticut
 79-0116 – Warrior Park, Davis-Monthan AFB, Tucson, Arizona
 79-0173 – New England Air Museum, Windsor Locks, Connecticut
 79-0195 - Russell Military Museum Zion, Illinois
 80-0168 – Fort Wayne Air National Guard Base, Fort Wayne, Indiana
 80-0247 – American Airpower Museum, Republic Airport, Farmingdale, New York
 80-0708 – Selfridge Military Air Museum, Selfridge Air National Guard Base, Harrison Township, Michigan

Specifications (A-10C)

Notable appearances in media

Nicknames
The A-10 Thunderbolt II received its popular nickname "Warthog" from the pilots and crews of the USAF attack squadrons who flew and maintained it. The A-10 is the last of Republic's jet attack aircraft to serve with the USAF. The Republic F-84 Thunderjet was nicknamed the "Hog", F-84F Thunderstreak nicknamed "Superhog", and the Republic F-105 Thunderchief tagged "Ultra Hog". The saying Go Ugly Early has been associated with the aircraft in reference to calling in the A-10 early to support troops in ground combat.

See also

References

Notes

Citations

Bibliography

 Bell, Dana. A-10 Warthog in Detail & Scale, Blue Ridge Summit, Pennsylvania: TAB Books, 1986. .
 Burton, James G. The Pentagon Wars: Reformers Challenge the Old Guard, Annapolis, Maryland: Naval Institute Press, 1993. .
 Campbell, Douglas N. The Warthog and the Close Air Support Debate. Annapolis, Maryland: Naval Institute Press, 2003. 
 
 Donald, David and Daniel J. March, eds. "A-10 Fighting Warthog". Modern Battlefield Warplanes. Norwalk, Connecticut: AIRtime, 2004. .
 Drendel, Lou. A-10 Warthog in Action. Carrollton, Texas: Squadron/Signal Publications, 1981. .
 "The Fairchild A-10A: More Thunder for the USAF", Air International, Vol. 6, No. 5, May 1974, pp. 219–25, 263. Bromley, UK: Pilot Press. .
 "The Fairchild Can-Opener: Shturmovik of the Eighties?", Air International, Vol. 16, No. 6, June 1979, pp. 267–72, 287. Bromley, UK: Pilot Press. .
 Fitzsimmons, Bernard (ed.). A-10 Thunderbolt II (Modern Fighting Aircraft Series). New York: Arco Publishing, Inc., 1984. .
 Jenkins, Dennis R. Fairchild-Republic A/OA-10 Warthog. North Branch, Minnesota: Specialty Press, 1998. .
 
 
 
 Melampy, Jake. Modern Hog Guide: The A-10 Exposed. Trenton, Ohio: Reid Air Publications, 2007. .
 Neubeck, Ken. A-10 Warthog, Mini in-action. Carrollton, Texas: Squadron/Signal Publications, 1995. .
 Neubeck, Ken. A-10 Warthog Walk Around. Carrollton, Texas: Squadron/Signal Publications, 1999. .
 Shaw, Robert. Fighter Combat: Tactics and Maneuvering. Annapolis, Maryland: Naval Institute Press, 1985. .
 Spick, Mike. The Great Book of Modern Warplanes. London: Salamander Books, 2000. .
 Stephens, Rick. "A-10 Thunderbolt II". World Air Power Journal, 1995. .
 Stephens, Rick. "Fairchild A-10: Fighting Warthog", World Air Power Journal, Volume 16, Spring 1994, pp. 32–83, Aerospace Publishing, London. . .
 Sweetman, Bill. The Great Book of Modern Warplanes, New York: Portland House, 1987. .
 Taylor, John W. R. Jane's All the World's Aircraft 1982–83. London: Jane's Yearbooks, 1982. .
 
 Winchester, Jim, ed. "Fairchild A-10 Thunderbolt II", Military Aircraft of the Cold War (The Aviation Factfile), Rochester, Kent, UK: The Grange plc., 2006. .

External links

 Republic A-10A page, A-10 Construction, and Night/Adverse Weather A-10 pages on National Museum of the United States Air Force site
 TO 1A-10A-1 Flight Manual USAF Series A-10A Aircraft Serno 75-00258 and Subsequent (1988)
 A-10 Thunderbolt II in action on youtube.com
 Detailed explanation of A-10 design & engineering, 16′ 26″ video

1970s United States attack aircraft
Aircraft first flown in 1972
Anti-tank aircraft
A-10 Thunderbolt II
Low-wing aircraft
Twin-tail aircraft
Twinjets